Aliagha Aghayev (March 22, 1913 – November 13, 1983) was a Soviet and Azerbaijani actor. He was awarded the People's Artist of the Azerbaijan SSR. He was famous for his comedy roles.

About
Aliagha Aghayev was born on March 22, 1913 in Baku, Russian Empire. After graduating from the 7th class in 1930, he studied at a vocational school at the ship's repair plant named after the Paris Commune. 2 years later, after he completed the school, started to work in the factory. Then Aliagha Aliyev joined to the factory's drama community. His first role was "Haji Kara" in the "Haji Kara" comedy by Mirza Fatali Akhundov. 

The actor joined the State Theatre of Young Spectators collective in the late 1930s. He made his first appearance on the stage at professional theater with the Jules Verne drama "The Children of Captain Grant". The actor was admitted to the National Academic Drama Theatre in the fall of 1961. His first original role in this theatre was "Abish Surkhayevich" in Shikhali Gurbanov's comedy "We Got a Job" in 1961. A.Aghayev worked at National Academic Drama Theatre for 22 years. 

A.Aghayev's some roles in Academic Theatre — "Vasin" ("Tanya" — Aleksei Arbuzov), "Allanazar" ("Who is Guilty?" — Huseyn Mukhtarov), "Gulamali", "Abishov", "Naghi"("Kozaran Ojaglar", "Village Girl", "Good Man" — Mirza Ibrahimov), "Stephano" ("The Tempest" — William Shakespeare), "Rista Podorovich" ("The Cabinet Minister's Wife" — Branislav Nušić) and others. 

He was mostly known for his "Mashadi Ibad" role in "If Not That One, Then This One" movie. His other movie roles are also so famous as "Khan" ("A Magical Coat"), "Shikhali" (Dating"), cashier ("Where is Ahmed?"), storekeeper ("For the Sake of the Law"/"Mehman") and others. 

Aghayev died on November 13, 1983 in Baku, Azerbaijan SSR, USSR.

Awards
Honored Art Worker of the Azerbaijan SSR — June 17, 1943
Order of the Red Banner of Labour — June 9, 1959
Peoples Artist of the Azerbaijan SSR — February 27, 1954

Filmography
Case №777 (1992)
The Cloth Peddler (1965)
Bashir Safaroglu (1969)
Our Jabish Teacher (1969)
Crazy Kura (1969)
The Darvish Detonates Paris (1976)
A Transverse House of Darling (1982)
Where is Ahmed? (1963)
 The Meeting (1955)
For the Sake of the Law (1968)
Koroghlu (1960)
 Not that one, then this one (1956)
 The Magic Gown (1964)
Shared Bread (1969)

See also
List of People's Artists of the Azerbaijan SSR

References

External links
 

1913 births
1983 deaths
20th-century Azerbaijani male actors
Actors from Baku
People's Artists of the Azerbaijan SSR
Recipients of the Order of the Red Banner of Labour
Azerbaijani male film actors
Azerbaijani male stage actors
Soviet male actors